The 2019–20 CAF Champions League (officially the 2019–20 Total CAF Champions League for sponsorship reasons) was the 56th edition of Africa's premier club football tournament organized by the Confederation of African Football (CAF), and the 24th edition under the current CAF Champions League title.

This season was to be the first to follow an August–to-May schedule, as per the decision of the CAF Executive Committee on 20 July 2017. However, the COVID-19 pandemic caused the semi-finals and final of the competition to be postponed until October and November 2020. Moreover, for the first time, the final was played as a single match at a venue pre-selected by CAF, and was originally to be played at the Japoma Stadium in Douala, Cameroon. However, during the suspension of the tournament due to the COVID-19 pandemic, Cameroon decided to withdraw from hosting, and instead, the final was played in Egypt, at the Cairo International Stadium in Cairo.

Al Ahly won a record 9th title, defeating fellow Egyptian rivals Zamalek 2–1 in the final.

As winners of the 2019–20 CAF Champions League, Al Ahly qualified for the 2020 FIFA Club World Cup in Qatar, and earned the right to play against the winners of the 2019–20 CAF Confederation Cup in the 2020–21 CAF Super Cup.

This was the first time in the history of the CAF Champions League that the final was contested between two clubs from the same country.

Association team allocation
All 56 CAF member associations may enter the CAF Champions League, with the 12 highest ranked associations according to their CAF 5-Year Ranking eligible to enter two teams in the competition. As a result, theoretically a maximum of 68 teams could enter the tournament – although this level has never been reached.

For the 2019–20 CAF Champions League, the CAF uses the 2015–2019 CAF 5-Year Ranking, which calculates points for each entrant association based on their clubs’ performance over those 5 years in the CAF Champions League and CAF Confederation Cup. The criteria for points are the following:

The points are multiplied by a coefficient according to the year as follows:
2018–19 – 5
2018 – 4
2017 – 3
2016 – 2
2015 – 1

This was announced by the CAF on 4 June 2019, as using the previous scheme, it would be based on results from 2014 to 2018. The only change for the top 12 associations is that Tanzania is included while Ivory Coast is excluded.

Teams
The following 61 teams from 49 associations entered the competition.
Three teams (in bold) received a bye to the first round.
The other 58 teams entered the preliminary round.

Associations are shown according to their 2015–2019 CAF 5-Year Ranking – those with a ranking score have their rank and score indicated.

Notes

Associations which did not enter a team

Schedule
The schedule of the competition is as follows.

On 24 November 2019, CAF made a change to all fixtures dates starting from the group stage matchday 4 to the final, due to rescheduling of the 2020 African Nations Championship from January/February to April. The quarter-finals draw date was also changed.

Following the quarter-finals, due to the COVID-19 pandemic in Africa, the semi-finals, originally scheduled for 1–2 May (first legs) and 8–9 May (second legs), were postponed indefinitely on 11 April 2020, and the final, originally scheduled for 29 May, was also postponed on 18 April 2020. On 30 June 2020, the CAF Executive Committee proposed that the competition would resume with a Final Four format played as single matches in a host country to be decided. However, these plans were later halted after the Cameroonian Football Federation withdrew from hosting the Final Four, and the CAF decided against hosting it in either Egypt or Morocco in the principle of fairness. On 3 August 2020, the CAF announced that the competition would resume in its original format with the semi-finals played on 25–26 September (first legs) and 2–3 October (second legs), and the final played on 16 or 17 October. On 10 September 2020, the CAF announced that at the request of the Royal Moroccan Football Federation, the semi-finals were rescheduled to 17–18 October (first legs) and 23–24 October (second legs), and the final to 6 November. On 22 October 2020, the CAF announced that the semi-final second leg between Zamalek and Raja Casablanca, originally scheduled to be played on 24 October, was postponed to 1 November, due to Raja Casablanca being required by Moroccan authorities to self-isolate until 27 October after eight players testing positive for the COVID-19 virus, with the total number of cases increasing to fourteen the following day. On 30 October 2020, the CAF announced that this match was further postponed to 4 November, the final postponed to 27 November.

Qualifying rounds

Preliminary round

First round

Group stage

In each group, teams play against each other home-and-away in a round-robin format. The group winners and runners-up advance to the quarter-finals of the knockout stage.

Group A

Group B

Group C

Group D

Knockout stage

Bracket

Quarter-finals

Semi-finals

Final

Top goalscorers

See also
2019–20 CAF Confederation Cup
2020–21 CAF Super Cup

Notes

References

External links
Total CAF Champions League, CAFonline.com
CAF Total Champions League 2019/20

 
2019-20
1
1
Association football events postponed due to the COVID-19 pandemic